Matthew Peca (born April 27, 1993) is a Canadian professional ice hockey forward currently playing for the Springfield Thunderbirds in the American Hockey League (AHL) while under contract to the St. Louis Blues of the National Hockey League (NHL). He was selected by the Tampa Bay Lightning in the seventh round (201st overall) of the 2011 NHL Entry Draft. After playing four years at Quinnipiac University, he made his NHL debut during the 2016–17 season.

Playing career

Amateur
Prior to turning professional, Peca played for the Pembroke Lumber Kings in the Central Canada Hockey League. He won the league title the Royal Bank Cup in his final year with Pembroke. He was drafted by the Windsor Spitfires in the Ontario Hockey League priority. In the offseason before the 2011–12 season, he was claimed off waivers by the Kitchener Rangers but never played for them due to his commitment to Quinnipiac University.

Peca attended Quinnipiac University for four years, where he played four seasons with the Quinnipiac Bobcats men's ice hockey team which competes in NCAA's Division I in the ECAC Hockey conference. He was recognized for his outstanding play with the Bobcats when he was named as a freshman to the 2011–12 ECAC Hockey All-Rookie Team, and in his final season was named to the 2014–15 All-ECAC Hockey First Team and team co-captain.

Professional
Peca was selected by the Tampa Bay Lightning in the seventh round in the 2011 NHL Entry Draft. After graduation from Quinnipac University, Peca signed an amateur try out with the Lightning's American Hockey League (AHL) affiliate, the Syracuse Crunch before signing a two-year entry level contract with the Lightning on April 1, 2015.

On December 27, 2016, the Lightning announced that Peca would be called up to the NHL roster. On December 28, Peca made his NHL debut in a 4–3 Lightning overtime win over the visiting Montreal Canadiens. On December 31, Peca recorded his first career NHL point, which was an assist on a goal by Alex Killorn. On January 3, 2017, Peca scored his first NHL goal against Connor Hellebuyck of the Winnipeg Jets, making him the first Quinnipiac Bobcat to score a goal in the NHL. On July 5, 2017, Peca signed a one-year, two-way contract extension with the Lightning. On January 4, 2018, Peca was named to the 2018 AHL All-Star game.

As a free agent, Peca signed a two-year, $2.6 million contract with the Montreal Canadiens on July 1, 2018. During the following 2018–19 season, on 8 November 2018, Peca scored his first goal for Montreal in a 6–5 overtime defeat against the Buffalo Sabres. In the final year of his contract with the Canadiens in the 2019–20 season, Peca was unable to keep his role in the NHL through training camp and was placed on waivers before he was assigned to AHL affiliate, the Laval Rocket. He appeared in five scoreless games on recall with Montreal through the season, before he was dealt at the NHL trade deadline to the Ottawa Senators in exchange for Aaron Luchuk and a 2020 draft pick on February 24, 2020. He played in five games for the Senators, registering one assist and an additional 21 games for Ottawa's AHL affiliate, the Belleville Senators, scoring three goals and eleven points.

On July 29, 2021, Peca was signed as a free agent to a one-year, two-way contract with the St. Louis Blues. He was assigned to the Blues' AHL affiliate, the Springfield Thunderbirds after clearing waivers at the beginning of the 2021–22 season. Peca was recalled on December 10, 2021 and played in five games with the Blues, registering one point before being sent to Springfield again on December 20. He was re-signed by the Blues to a two-year contract extension on March 23, 2022.

Career statistics

Awards and honours

References

External links 
 

1993 births
Living people
Canadian expatriate ice hockey players in the United States
Canadian ice hockey centres
Franco-Ontarian people
Ice hockey people from Ontario
Laval Rocket players
Montreal Canadiens players
Ottawa Senators players
Quinnipiac Bobcats men's ice hockey players
Springfield Thunderbirds players
St. Louis Blues players
Syracuse Crunch players
Tampa Bay Lightning draft picks
Tampa Bay Lightning players